Mandeulgaon is a village located in Badnapur taluka of Jalna district, in state of Maharashtra, India.

Demographics
As per 2011 census:
Mandeulgaon has 359 families residing. The village has population of 1872.
Out of the population of 1872, 957 are males while 915 are females.
Literacy rate of the village is 67.75%.
Average sex ratio of the village is 956 females to 1000 males. Average sex ratio of Maharashtra state is 929.

Geography, and transport

References

Villages in Jalna district